The Ringo Starr & His All-Starr Band 30th Anniversary Tour was a concert tour by the rock supergroup Ringo Starr & His All-Starr Band that began on 21 March 2019 at Harrah's Resort Southern California in Valley Center, California, and concluded on 1 September 2019 at the Greek Theatre in Los Angeles, California. With concerts in the United States and Japan, as well as one show in Canada, the tour celebrated the anniversary of frontman Ringo Starr's first All-Starr Band tour in 1989.

The setlist for the tour included songs by Starr—both by his former band the Beatles and from his career as a solo artist—as well as songs by All-Starr band members and their associated bands, including Steve Lukather and Warren Ham of Toto, Gregg Rolie (formerly of Santana and Journey), Colin Hay of Men at Work, and Hamish Stuart (formerly of Average White Band). Drummer Gregg Bissonette also played on the tour.

Reception
Matthew Leimkuehler of The Tennessean, reviewing the 7 August show at Nashville, Tennessee's Ryman Auditorium, characterized Starr's stage presence as modest yet playful, and commended the "jukebox format [that] keeps the 130-minute show moving quickly." He concluded that, "There's a carefree, no-nonsense quality to the show that's easy to embrace; it's plain-and-simple fun."

Dan DeLuca, in his review of 14 August show at Philadelphia, Pennsylvania's Metropolitan Opera House, called Hay "the standout vocalist of the show", but noted that, "By the third go-round of non-Starr tunes, the show started to drag and became something to endure more than enjoy, with the crowd impatiently calling for 'Ringo!' between songs." However, DeLuca concluded that "all was well once the Beatle came down off his drum throne and back into the spotlight [...] That Beatles magic was in the air, and everyone in the room was Ringo's friend."

Setlist
This is the setlist that was performed at the 7 August show at Nashville's Ryman Auditorium, and may not represent the setlist of every show on the tour.
 "Matchbox"
 "It Don't Come Easy"
 "What Goes On"
 "Evil Ways" (with Gregg Rolie)
 "Rosanna" (with Steve Lukather)
 "Pick Up the Pieces" (with Hamish Stuart)
 "Down Under" (with Colin Hay)
 "Boys"
 "Don't Pass Me By"
 "Yellow Submarine"
 "Cut the Cake" (with Hamish Stuart)
 "Black Magic Woman" (with Gregg Rolie)
 "You're Sixteen"
 "Anthem"
 "Overkill" (with Colin Hay)
 "Africa" (with Steve Lukather)
 "Work to Do" (with Hamish Stuart)
 "Oye Como Va" (with Gregg Rolie)
 "I Wanna Be Your Man"
 "Who Can It Be Now?" (with Colin Hay)
 "Hold the Line" (with Steve Lukather)
 "Photograph"
 "Act Naturally"
 "With a Little Help from My Friends" / "Give Peace a Chance"

Tour dates

References

2019 concert tours
Ringo Starr & His All-Starr Band